lyrics is the first and only concept album of Japanese singer-songwriter Miho Komatsu. It was released on 26 November 2003 under Giza Studio.

Album includes tracks from previously released albums and couplings from singles based on the voting polls by the fans. Two songs (track #13 and #15) received new arrangements exclusively for this album. The album was released on same day as her single Tsubasa wa Nakutemo and her first essay book Hen na Monosashi.

The album reached No. 45 in its first week on the charts selling 8,184 copies. The album charted for three weeks and sold more than 10,709 copies.

Track listing

References

Miho Komatsu songs
Giza Studio albums
2003 compilation albums
Being Inc. compilation albums
Japanese-language compilation albums
Albums produced by Daiko Nagato